Stiphodon zebrinus is a species of goby known only from Sungei Iga, Halmahera, Indonesia.
  
This species can reach a length of  SL.

References

zebrinus
Taxa named by Ronald E. Watson
Taxa named by Gerald R. Allen
Taxa named by Maurice Kottelat
Fish described in 1998